In mathematics, a rotation map is a function that represents an undirected edge-labeled graph, where each vertex enumerates its outgoing neighbors. Rotation maps were first introduced by Reingold, Vadhan and Wigderson (“Entropy waves, the zig-zag graph product, and new constant-degree expanders”, 2002) in order to conveniently define the zig-zag product and prove its properties.

Definition
For a D-regular graph G, the rotation map  is defined as follows:  if the i th edge leaving v leads to w, and the j th edge leaving w leads to v.

Basic properties
From the definition we see that  is a permutation, and moreover  is the identity map ( is an involution).

Special cases and properties 
 A rotation map is consistently labeled if all the edges leaving each vertex are labeled in such a way that at each vertex, the labels of the incoming edges are all distinct. Every regular graph has some consistent labeling.
 A consistent rotation map can be used to encode a coined discrete time quantum walk on a (regular) graph.
 A rotation map is -consistent if . From the definition, a -consistent rotation map is consistently labeled.

See also
Zig-zag product
Rotation system

References

 

 

 

Extensions and generalizations of graphs
Graph operations